John Dwight may refer to:
 John Dwight (died 1661), English settler of Dedham, Massachusetts and progenitor of the Dwight family
 John Dwight (manufacturer) (1819–1903), American pioneer manufacturer of bicarbonate of soda
 John Dwight (potter) (died 1703), English Potter
 John Sullivan Dwight (1813–1893), American music critic and Unitarian minister
 John Wilbur Dwight(1859–1928), US politician

See also
 Jonathan Dwight, American ornithologist